BONZ Group (Pty) Ltd v Cooke [1994] 3 NZLR 216 is a cited case in New Zealand regarding section 9 of the Fair Trading Act 1986.

References

Court of Appeal of New Zealand cases
1994 in New Zealand law
1994 in case law